Svitlana Ivanivna Chernikova (born 22 May 1977) is a Ukrainian former competitive ice dancer. With Oleksandr Sosnenko, she won silver at the 1994 Prague Skate and at the 1994 Ukrainian Championships. The two competed at the 1994 Winter Olympics in Lillehammer, placing 19th. They were coached by Halyna Churilova.

Competitive highlights 
with Sosnenko

References 

1977 births
Figure skaters at the 1994 Winter Olympics
Living people
Olympic figure skaters of Ukraine
People from Prokhorovsky District
Russian emigrants to Ukraine
Ukrainian female ice dancers